The Treaty of Paris ended the Anglo-French War of 1294–1303, and was signed on 20 May 1303 between Philip IV of France and Edward I of England. Based on the terms of the treaty, Gascony was restored to England from France following its occupation during the war, thus setting the stage for the Hundred Years' War (1337–1453). Moreover, it was confirmed that Philip's daughter would marry Edward's son (the later Edward II of England), as already agreed in the Treaty of Montreuil (1299).

See also
 List of treaties

External links
 Excerpt of 'Queen Isabella'

Paris (1303)
1300s in France
1303 in England
Paris
Paris (1303)
Edward I of England
14th century in Paris
14th-century military history of France